Michael Kandel (born December 24, 1941 in Baltimore, Maryland) is an American translator and author of science fiction.

Biography

Kandel received a doctorate in Slavistics from Indiana University.  His most recent position was editor at the Modern Language Association. Prior to that, at Harcourt, he edited (among others) Ursula K. Le Guin's work.

Kandel is perhaps best known for his translations of the works of Stanisław Lem from Polish to English. 

Recently he has also been translating works of other Polish science fiction authors, such as Jacek Dukaj, Tomasz Kołodziejczak, Marek Huberath and Andrzej Sapkowski. The quality of his translations is considered to be excellent; his skill is especially notable in the case of Lem's writing, which makes heavy use of wordplay and other difficult-to-translate devices.

Bibliography

Novels
Strange Invasion (1989)
In Between Dragons (1990)
Captain Jack Zodiac (1991)
Panda Ray (1996)

Short fiction
"Virtual Reality" (1993) in Simulations (ed. Karie Jacobson)
"Ogre" (1994) in Black Thorn, White Rose (ed. Ellen Datlow and Terri Windling)
"Acolytes" (1997) in The Horns of Elfland (ed. Ellen Kushner, Delia Sherman, and Donald G. Keller)
"Wading River Dogs and More" in Asimov's, May 1998
"Hooking Up" in Fantasy and Science Fiction, August 1999
"Time to Go" in Fantasy and Science Fiction, November 2004
"Enlightenment" in Thrilling Wonder Stories, Summer 2007

Translations
Stanisław Lem
Memoirs Found in a Bathtub (with Christine Rose, 1973)
The Cyberiad (1974)
The Futurological Congress (1974)
The Star Diaries (1976)
Mortal Engines (1977)
A Perfect Vacuum (1978)
His Master's Voice (1983)
Fiasco (1987)
Peace on Earth (with Elinor Ford, 1994)
Highcastle: A Remembrance (1995)

Paweł Huelle
Who Was David Weiser? (1992) - first translated by Antonia Lloyd-Jones (1991).
Moving House and Other Stories (1995) - first translated by Antonia Lloyd-Jones (1994).

Marek S. Huberath
Nest of Worlds (Restless Books, 2014)
 "Yoo Retoont, Sneogg. Ay Noo" on Words without Borders; in A Polish Book of Monsters  (PIASA Books, 2010) 
 "Balm of a Long Farewell" on Words without Borders

Andrzej Stasiuk
On the Road to Babadag (Houghton Mifflin Harcourt, 2011)

Kayko and Kokosh comic book series by Janusz Christa.
Flying School (Egmont Poland, 2018)
The Big Tournament (Egmont Poland, 2018)

Editor and translator
Mortal Engines (Seabury, 1977):  Stories by Stanisław Lem
The Cosmic Carnival of Stanisław Lem: An Anthology of Entertaining Stories by the Modern Master of Science Fiction (Continuum, 1981) 
A Polish Book of Monsters: Five Dark Tales from Contemporary Poland (PIASA Books, 2010):  Stories by Marek Huberath, Andrzej Sapkowski, Tomasz Kołodziejczak, Andrzej Zimniak, and Jacek Dukaj

Notes

External links

 Michael Kandel on Words Without Borders
"Being an Editor" by Michael Kandel
"Translation is Quixotic: A Conversation with Michael Kandel" at Restless Books

20th-century American novelists
American male novelists
American science fiction writers
Science fiction editors
Polish–English translators
Living people
1941 births
American male short story writers
20th-century translators
20th-century American short story writers
20th-century American male writers
Translators of Stanisław Lem